William Morrison may refer to:

Arts and literature
 William McKenzie Morrison (1857–1921), American photographer
 William Morrison (poet) (1881–1973), Irish poet
 Joseph Samachson or William Morrison (1906–1980), science-fiction writer
 William Morrison (director), music video director and musician

Business
 William Morrison (trader) (19th century), fur trader in Old Crow Wing, Minnesota
 William Morrison (businessman) (1874–1956), founder of supermarket chains

Politics
 William Morrison (American politician), member of the North Carolina General Assembly of 1779
 William Ralls Morrison (1824–1909), U.S. Representative from Illinois
 William Robert Morrison (1878–1947), Canadian politician and Mayor of Hamilton, Ontario
 William Morrison (Alberta politician) (1891–1970), former member of the Legislative Assembly of Alberta
 William Morrison, 1st Viscount Dunrossil (1893–1961), British politician and Governor General of Australia
 William McG. Morrison (1903–1960), mayor of Charleston, South Carolina
 William Morrison (Australian politician) (1928–2013), Member of the Australian House of Representatives
 William Morrison (Canadian politician), politician in Lillooet, British Columbia

Science
 William Morrison (gardener), plant collector employed by Kew, 1824–1839
 William Morrison (chemist) (1850-1927), inventor of the first practical electrical car
 William Morrison (dentist) (1860–1926), American dentist

Sports
 Edward Morrison (American football) (1894–1961), American college football coach
 William Morrison (cricketer) (1850–1910), New Zealand cricketer
 William Morrison (rugby union) (1875-1944), Scotland international rugby union player

Other people
 William Vitruvius Morrison (1794–1838), Irish architect
 William Morrison (missionary) (1867–1918), American missionary based in the Congo Free State
 William V. Morrison (1906–1977), lawyer, probate investigator, and genealogical researcher
 William R. Morrison (historian) (born 1942), Canadian historian of the Canadian North
 William Garth Morrison (1943–2013), Chief Scout of the United Kingdom and Overseas Territories

See also 
 Bill Morrison (disambiguation)
 William Morison (disambiguation)